Dörfel is a German surname. Notable people with the surname include:

Bernd Dörfel (born 1944), German footballer, brother of Gert
Emmy Dörfel (1908–2002), German nurse
Friedo Dörfel (1915–1980), German footballer
Gert Dörfel (born 1939), German footballer, brother of Bernd

German-language surnames